The 2015 NCAA Division I men's soccer tournament (also known as the 2015 College Cup) was the 57th annual single-elimination tournament to determine the national champion of NCAA Division I men's collegiate soccer. The first, second, third, and quarterfinal rounds were held at college campus sites across the United States during November and December 2015, with host sites determined by seeding and record. The four-team College Cup finals were played at Children's Mercy Park in Kansas City, Kansas from December 11–13, 2015.

The defending national champions, the Virginia Cavaliers, were eliminated in the tournament's second round. Stanford won their first-ever national title by defeating Clemson, 4–0 in the final.

Qualification

All Division I men's soccer programs except for Grand Canyon, Incarnate Word, UMass Lowell, and Northern Kentucky were eligible to qualify for the tournament. Those four programs were ineligible because they were in transition from Division II to Division I. The tournament field remained fixed at 48 teams.

Of the 23 schools that had previously won the championship, 13 qualified for this year's tournament.

Format 
As in previous editions of the NCAA Division I Tournament, the tournament featured 48 participants out of a possible field of 202 teams. Of the 48 berths, 24 were allocated to the 21 conference tournament champions and to the regular season winners of the Ivy League, Pac-12 Conference, and West Coast Conference, which do not have tournaments. The remaining 24 berths were supposed to be determined through an at-large process based upon the Ratings Percentage Index (RPI) of teams that did not automatically qualify.

The NCAA Selection Committee also named the top sixteen seeds for the tournament, with those teams receiving an automatic bye into the second round of the tournament. The remaining 32 teams played in a single-elimination match in the first round of the tournament for the right to play a seeded team in the second round.

Schedule

Bracket

Regional 1

Regional 2

Regional 3

Regional 4

College Cup

Results 
Home team through quarterfinals on left

First round

Second round

Third round

Quarterfinals

College Cup

Semifinals

Championship

Statistics

Goalscorers

5 goals

 Jordan Morris — Stanford

3 goals

 Stuart Holthusen — Akron

2 goals

 Richie Laryea — Akron
 Victor Souto — Akron
 Simon Enström — Boston College
 T. J. Casner — Clemson
 Saul Chinchilla — Clemson
 Thales Moreno — Clemson
 Kwame Awuah — Connecticut
 Ricky Lopez-Espin — Creighton
 Ricardo Perez — Creighton
 Timo Pitter — Creighton
 Cooper Vandermaas-Peeler — Elon
 Eryk Williamson — Maryland
 Amir Bashti — Stanford
 Brandon Vincent — Stanford
 Ben Polk — Syracuse
 Juan Sebastián Sánchez — Tulsa

1 goal

 Adam Najem — Akron
 Sean Sepe — Akron
 Gonçalo Soares — Akron
 Trevor Davock — Boston College
 Isaac Normesinu — Boston College
 Felix De Bona — Boston University
 Diego Campos — Clemson
 Aaron Jones — Clemson
 Iman Mafi — Clemson
 Brandt Bronico — Charlotte
 Luke Waechter — Charlotte
 Martin Melchor — Coastal Carolina
 Tobenna Uzo — Coastal Carolina
 DeAndrae Brown — Connecticut
 Fernando Castellanos — Creighton
 Evan Waldrep — Creighton
 Justin Donawa — Dartmouth
 Alexander Marsh — Dartmouth
 Kennedy Nwabia — Dayton
 Maik Schoonderwoerd — Dayton
 Carlos Sendin — Dayton
 Alec Bartlett — Drake
 Steven Enna — Drake
 James Grunert — Drake
 Eduardo Alvarez — Elon
 James Brace — Elon
 Jaiden Fortune — Elon
 Luis Betancur — FIU
 Brad Fountain — FIU
 Lewis Hawke — Furman
 Brandon Allen — Georgetown
 Arun Basuljevic — Georgetown
 Alex Muyl — Georgetown
 Keegan Rosenberry — Georgetown
 Daniel Massey — Hofstra
 Mario Ruiz — Hofstra
 Ben Maurey — Indiana
 Kevin Barajas — Kentucky
 Mark Forrest — Lehigh
 Simon Hestnes — LIU Brooklyn
 Alex Crognale — Maryland
 Ivan Magalhães — Maryland
 Tucker Hume — North Carolina
 Zach Wright — North Carolina
 Patrick Berneski — Notre Dame
 Jeffrey Farina — Notre Dame
 Austin Ricci — Oakland
 Matt Rickard — Oakland
 Danny Jensen — Ohio State
 Abdi Mohamed — Ohio State
 Jamie Summers — Radford
 Sugor Al Awwad — Rutgers
 Ahmad Faheem — Rutgers
 Dylan Autran — Santa Clara
 Edson Cardona — Santa Clara
 Carlos Delgadillo — Santa Clara
 Luis Urias — Santa Clara
 Hamza Haddadi — Seattle
 David Olsen — Seattle
 Idrissa Camara — SMU
 Stanton Garcia — SMU
 Brenden Lee — SMU
 Danny Deakin — South Carolina
 Prosper Figbe — South Florida
 Corey Baird — Stanford
 Foster Langsdorf — Stanford
 Eric Verso — Stanford
 Louis Cross — Syracuse
 Kamal Miller — Syracuse
 Noah Rhynhart — Syracuse
 Miles Robinson — Syracuse
 Geoffrey Dee — Tulsa
 Miguel Velasquez — Tulsa
 Jordan Vale — UCLA
 Kevin Feucht — UC Santa Barbara
 Ismaila Jome — UC Santa Barbara
 Seo-In Kim — UC Santa Barbara
 Jake Rozhansky — Virginia
 Marcus Salandy-Defour — Virginia
 Jon Bakero — Wake Forest
 Ricky Greensfelder — Wake Forest
 Ian Harkes — Wake Forest

Own goals

 Brad Ruhaak — Akron (playing against SMU)
 Austin Wilcox — Cal Poly (playing against UCLA)
 Taylor Curtis — SMU (playing against Akron)

See also 
 NCAA Men's Soccer Championships (Division II, Division III)
 NCAA Women's Soccer Championships (Division I, Division II, Division III)

References 

Tournament
NCAA Division I Men's Soccer Tournament seasons
NCAA
NCAA Division I men's soccer tournament
NCAA Division I men's soccer tournament
NCAA Division I men's soccer tournament